Marc Klasfeld is an American music video director. He has directed over two hundred music videos for artists such as Slipknot, Sum 41, Katy Perry, Jay-Z, Red Hot Chili Peppers, Britney Spears, Kid Rock, Michael Bublé, Nelly, Foo Fighters, Kelly Clarkson, Charli XCX, Little Mix, Nick Jonas, Twenty One Pilots,  Avril Lavigne, Aerosmith, Charlie Puth and many others with multiple award wins and nominations.

His hit video for Wiz Khalifa and Charlie Puth's "See You Again" is currently the 2nd-most-viewed video on YouTube at 3 billion views, surpassing Psy's "Gangnam Style" on July 10, 2017, but later surpassed by Luis Fonsi and Daddy Yankee's "Despacito" on August 4, 2017. He is also the founder of Rockhard, a music video production company that has produced videos for Justin Bieber, Lady Gaga, LMFAO, Britney Spears, Aerosmith, Prince, Mariah Carey, Kelly Rowland, Jessie J, Pixie Lott, Adam Lambert, and Big Time Rush among others.

He is also a director of television commercials for Target, Nike, NFL, NBA, Motorola, Reebok, Cartoon Network and Hummer. His best-known commercial work is for Justin Timberlake's Target campaign, ESPN's This is SportsCenter campaign, Hammer Pants Dance for the A&E Network's reality show Hammertime, Avril Lavigne's Canon campaigns and Smirnoff's Green Tea Partay viral video sung by Sebastian Siegel.

On March 29, 2010, Klasfeld released a comedic video of an elementary school reenactment of the Al Pacino film Scarface, entitled "Scarface School Play". It was shown on CNN, CBS, ABC, NBC and Fox News.

Klasfeld is making his feature film directorial debut in the screen adaptation of David Morrell’s novel Creepers.

He is a graduate of NYU's Tisch School of the Arts. Klasfeld is signed to TrePalm in Toronto, Canada, and Hound Content in the United States.

Partial videography

References

External links
Official site

American film directors
American music video directors
Living people
Tisch School of the Arts alumni
Place of birth missing (living people)
Year of birth missing (living people)